Frank Gilbert Gibson (September 27, 1890 – April 27, 1961) was a Major League Baseball catcher. He played all or part of eight seasons in the majors for the Detroit Tigers and Boston Braves.

After two seasons, he was picked up by the Tigers, making his major league debut with them in April . He played in 23 games for the Tigers, batting just .140, with below average fielding. He also played in 87 games with the Nashville Vols of the Southern Association.

On May 5, 1914, the Tigers released Gibson and he rejoined Nashville.

Following four seasons with the Bronchos (renamed the Bears in 1919), Gibson was purchased from the team by the Boston Braves in August 1920. He made his return to the major leagues in  after eight years away. For the next four seasons, Gibson served as backup for the Braves starting catcher, Mickey O'Neil. In , Gibson was made the club's starting catcher, and he responded by batting .278 and driving in a career-high 50 runs.

Gibson's tenure as a starter would be brief, however, as the Braves acquired veteran catcher Zack Taylor during the next offseason. In 1927, Shanty Hogan took over the full-time job, and Gibson backed up both men. Following the 1927 season, Gibson was sold to the St. Louis Cardinals, but he never played for them. He played three more seasons in the minor leagues, finishing his career with the minor league Baltimore Orioles in

References

External links

1890 births
1961 deaths
Major League Baseball catchers
Detroit Tigers players
Boston Braves players
Minor league baseball managers
Dallas Giants players
Nashville Vols players
Little Rock Travelers players
Beaumont Oilers players
San Antonio Bronchos players
San Antonio Bears players
Birmingham Barons players
Baltimore Orioles (IL) players
Sportspeople from Omaha, Nebraska
Baseball players from Nebraska